Michael Warren Schwartz is Robert H. Williams Endowed Chair, Professor of Medicine in the Division of Metabolism, Endocrinology and Nutrition at the University of Washington and Director of the UW Medicine Diabetes and Obesity Center of Excellence. He is the Director of the NIH-funded Nutrition Obesity Research Center  (NORC) at the University of Washington. His research investigates brain mechanisms governing energy balance and glucose metabolism and how obesity and diabetes result from impairment of these brain systems. He has published more than 200 articles and book chapters related to these topics and his research has been continuously funded by the NIH since joining the faculty of UW 18 years ago. Dr. Schwartz is a member of the Association of American Physicians, the Western Association of Physicians, and the American Society for Clinical Investigation, is the recipient of the 2007 Williams-Rachmiel Levine Award for Outstanding Mentorship from the Western Society for Clinical Investigation, the 2006 Naomi Berrie Award for Outstanding Achievement in Diabetes Research from Columbia University, and was the 2012 Solomon A. Berson Lecturer for the American Physiological Society, among other awards. He is a member of the editorial boards of the Journal of Clinical Investigation, American Journal of Physiology, Endocrine Reviews, Molecular Metabolism  and Frontiers in Neuroendocrinology.

Selected publications
 Schwartz MW, Peskind E, Raskind M, Nicolson M, Moore J, Morawiecki A, Boyko EJ, Porte D Jr. Cerebrospinal Fluid leptin levels: Relationship to plasma levels and to adiposity in humans. Nature Medicine. 2:589-93, 1996.
 Schwartz MW, Seeley RJ, Campfield LA, Burn P, Baskin DG. Identification of targets of leptin action in rat hypothalamus. J Clin Invest. 98:1101-1106, 1996.
 Seeley RJ, Yagaloff KA, Fisher SL, Burn P, Thiele TE, van Dijk G, Baskin DG, Schwartz MW. Melanocortin receptors in leptin effects. Nature. 390:349, 1997.
 Schwartz MW, Seeley RJ, Weigle DS, Woods SC, Campfield LA, Burn P, Baskin DG. Leptin increases proopimelanocortin (POMC) mRNA expression in the rostral arcuate nucleus. Diabetes. 46:2119-2123, 1997.
 Hahn T, Breininger JF, Baskin DG, Schwartz MW. Coexpression of Agrp and NPY in fasting-activated hypothalamic neurons. Nature Neuroscience. 1:271-272, 1998.
 Schwartz MW, Woods SC, Seeley RJ, Porte D Jr., and Baskin DG. Central nervous system control of food intake.  Nature. 404:661-671, 2000.
 Niswender KD, Morton GJ, Stearns WH, Rhodes CJ, Myers MG, Schwartz MW. Key enzyme in leptin-induced anorexia. Nature. 413:794-795, 2001.
 Morton GJ, Blevins JE, Williams DL, Niswender KD, Gelling RW, Rhodes CJ, Baskin DG, Schwartz MW. Leptin action in the forebrain regulates the hindbrain response to satiety signals. J Clin Invest. 115:703-710, 2005.
 Morton, GJ, Gelling, RN, Niswender KD, Morrison CD, Rhodes CJ, Schwartz MW. Leptin regulates insulin sensitivity via phosphatidylinositol-3-OH kinase signaling in mediobasal hypothalamic neurons. Cell Metab. 2:411-420, 2005.
 Schwartz MW, Porte D Jr. Diabetes, obesity, and the brain. Science. 307:375-379, 2005.
 Morton GJ, Cummings DE, Baskin DG, Barsh GS, Schwartz MW. Central nervous system control of food intake and body weight. Nature. 443:289-295, 2006.
 Sarruf DA, Thaler JP, Morton GJ, German J, Fischer JD, Ogimoto K, and Schwartz MW. FGF21 Action in the Brain Increases Energy Expenditure and Insulin Sensitivity in Obese Rats. Diabetes. 59:1817-1824, 2010. .
 Kaiyala KJ, Morton GJ, Leroux BG, Ogimoto K, Wisse BE and Schwartz MW. Identification of body fat mass as a major determinant of metabolic rate in mice. Diabetes. 59:1657-1666, 2010. .
 Ellacott KLJ, Morton GJ, Woods SC, Tso P, and Schwartz MW.  Assessment of feeding behavior in laboratory mice.  Cell Metabolism. 12:10-17, 2010. .
 Thaler JP, Yi C-X, Schur EA, Guyenet SJ, Hwang BH, Dietrich MO, Zhao X, Sarruf SA, Izgur V, Maravilla KR, Nguyen HT, Fischer JD, Matsen ME, Wisse BE, Morton GJ, Horvath TL, Baskin DG, Tschöp MH, Schwartz MW. Evidence That Obesity is Associated with Hypothalamic Injury in Rodent Models and Humans. J Clin Invest.  122:153-162, 2012. .

References

Year of birth missing (living people)
Living people
American endocrinologists